John Campbell is a New Zealand curler and curling coach.

On international level he is a two-time bronze medallist of Pacific Curling Championships.

Teams and events

Men's

Mixed doubles

Record as a coach of national teams

Personal life

References

External links

 Video: 

Living people
New Zealand male curlers

New Zealand curling coaches

Year of birth missing (living people)
Place of birth missing (living people)